This list is of the Cultural Properties of Japan designated in the category of  for the Prefecture of Kanagawa.

National Cultural Properties
As of 1 August 2019, fifty-one Important Cultural Properties (including six *National Treasures) have been designated, being of national significance.

Prefectural Cultural Properties
As of 1 August 2019, forty-two properties have been designated at a prefectural level.

Municipal Cultural Properties
As of 1 August 2019, a further one hundred and sixty-four properties have been designated as being of municipal importance.

See also
 Cultural Properties of Japan
 List of National Treasures of Japan (paintings)
 Japanese painting
 List of Historic Sites of Japan (Kanagawa)
 List of Cultural Properties of Japan - historical materials (Kanagawa)

References

External links
  Cultural Properties in Kanagawa Prefecture

Cultural Properties,Kanagawa
Cultural Properties,Paintings
Paintings,Kanagawa
Lists of paintings